Kristína Kučová (born 23 May 1990) is a Slovak tennis player. On 12 September 2016, she reached her best singles ranking of world No. 71. On 5 October 2009, she peaked at No. 168 in the WTA doubles rankings.
She has won one singles title on the WTA Challenger Tour with eleven singles titles and five doubles titles on the ITF Women's Circuit.

Kučová was an accomplished junior player, having won the girls' singles title at the 2007 US Open and reaching a combined career-high junior ranking of world No. 3, on 10 September 2009.

Playing for Slovakia Fed Cup team, she has a win–loss record of 1–5.

Personal life
Kučová’s elder sister Zuzana retired from the professional tour in 2013.

Tennis career

Junior years
At the 2007 US Open, the unseeded Kučová took the girls' singles title, defeating the 13th seed Julia Glushko in the third round, top seed and defending champion Anastasia Pavlyuchenkova in the quarterfinals, and number two seed Urszula Radwańska in the final. Kučová also reached the 2007 Wimbledon Championships and 2007 French Open girls' doubles quarterfinals. She reached the French Open quarterfinals with her compatriot Klaudia Boczová, losing to the eventual champions and third seeds, Ksenia Milevskaya and Urszula Radwańska. With her compatriot Lenka Juríková, she reached the Wimbledon quarterfinals and lost to the eventual runners-up Misaki Doi and Kurumi Nara.

2014
Kučová started the year in the qualifying for Sydney where she lost to Misaki Doi, then she lost in the first round of qualifying for the Australian Open to Paula Kania in three sets. She lost in qualifying for Doha to Mirjana Lucic-Baroni in straight sets, and also in Dubai where she lost to Flavia Pennetta. She managed to qualify for Katowice and then beat Monica Niculescu 6–1, 6–1 in the first round, before losing to Alizé Cornet. She lost in qualifying for the French Open to the wildcard Irina Ramialison, 1–6, 0–6, and in qualifying for Wimbledon to Maryna Zanevska.

She reached her first WTA Tour semifinal at Bucharest by beating Anna Schmiedlová, Cristina Dinu and Danka Kovinić, before losing to Roberta Vinci 1–6, 3–6 in the semifinals. She won the $50k event in Sobota, Poland by beating Sesil Karatantcheva in the final. She won a $25k event in Fleurus, Belgium by beating Evgeniya Rodina in the final. She lost in the second round of qualifying in Linz to Anna-Lena Friedsam, and in the first round of qualifying for Limoges to Katarzyna Piter.

2016: Breakthrough, Canadian Open semifinalist and top 100
Kučová failed to qualify for the Australian Open. She lost in the final qualifying round to Wang Yafan, despite having a match point in the second set.

After defeating Stefanie Vögele and Hsieh Su-wei, Kučová reached the quarterfinals in Kuala Lumpur, where she lost to the second seed Elina Svitolina despite winning the first set 6–1.

She qualified for the main draw of the Canadian Open by defeating Erin Routliffe and Christina McHale. She upset Yanina Wickmayer in the first round, who had won the singles and doubles titles in Washington the week before. In the second round, she caused a bigger upset by defeating the No. 8 seed, Carla Suárez Navarro, setting up a third-round clash with the Canadian Eugenie Bouchard. Kučová won the match in three sets to reach her first WTA Premier-level quarterfinal, where she beat the 15th seed, Johanna Konta, in straight sets. She was eventually eliminated in the semifinals by the tenth seed, Madison Keys. Following the tournament, she broke into the top 100 for the first time in her career.

2020-21: Maiden WTA 125 title & 250 final, US Open qualifying & win in 5 years
At the Miami Open, Kučová qualified for the main draw and proceeded to face world No. 1 and defending champion, Ashleigh Barty, in the second round. She led 5–2 in the final set and held a match point on serve at 5–3 but failed to convert it. She lost the match in three sets and Barty went on to successfully defend her title.

Performance timelines

Only main-draw results in WTA Tour, Grand Slam tournaments, Fed Cup/Billie Jean King Cup and Olympic Games are included in win–loss records.

Singles
Current after the 2023 Australian Open.

Doubles

WTA career finals

Singles: 1 (runner-up)

WTA 125 tournament finals

Singles: 1 (title)

ITF Circuit finals

Singles: 25 (11 titles, 14 runner–ups)

Doubles: 7 (5 titles, 2 runner–ups)

Fed Cup/Billie Jean King Cup participation

Singles (1–3)

Doubles (0–2)

Junior Grand Slam tournament finals

Girls' singles: 1 (title)

Head-to-head record

Top 10 wins

Notes

References

External links
 
 
 

1990 births
Living people
Tennis players from Bratislava
Slovak female tennis players
US Open (tennis) junior champions
Grand Slam (tennis) champions in girls' singles
21st-century Slovak women